Thomas Worsdell may refer to:

 Thomas Clarke Worsdell (1788–1862), coachbuilder
 Thomas William Worsdell (1838–1916), engineer and grandson of Thomas C. Worsdell